Feltex Carpets (originally Felt and Textiles Limited) is a manufacturer of residential and commercial carpets.

The company began its manufacturing operations in Australia in 1921, as Felt and Textiles of Australia Ltd. The company was publicly listed and acquired by Australian and New Zealand carpet manufacturer Godfrey Hirst Carpets after going into receivership in 2006. Its well-known residential brands in Australia and New Zealand include Feltex, Feltex Classic, Redbook, Redbook total, Redbook green and Feltex green.  Commercial ranges include Feltex Commercial, Feltex Woven Axminster, Feltex tile, Feltex tile by Design and Tascot.

Henri Van de Velde became managing director of Felt and Textiles in 1924, holding the position until his death in 1947. During this time the company expanded its product range and opened factories in New Zealand and South Africa. Felt and Textiles expanded into New Zealand in 1929 with the establishment of a subsidiary in Wellington called New Zealand Slippers. A subsidiary of the company started weaving Axminster carpets in Sydney in 1938, the first time that woven carpet had been manufactured in Australia. The company also had wool-scouring mills and factories for processing cow hair for underfelts. By 1945 Felt and Textiles Australia and its subsidiaries were manufacturing carpet, many kinds of felt including "Feltex" moth-proof floor coverings, cotton wool and wadding, woollen clothing and slippers. During World War 2 the company made military boots and special hard felt for shell cases.

South African operations began with a slipper factory established in Durban in 1931, and by 1941 the company claimed that most of the shoes and slippers worn in South Africa were made by Feltex. Around 27 percent of the company's net profits in 1960 came from South Africa, where it had 3,250 employees.

By 1966 Feltex products were being sold in 49 countries.  In 2000 Feltex Carpets became Australasia's biggest carpet manufacturer after it bought out US-based Shaw Industries but by 2005 the company was struggling and it went into receivership in 2006.

Factories in New Zealand were at Dannevirke, Feilding (closed 2009), Foxton (closed 2009), Kakariki yarn factory (closed 1997) Kakariki wool scouring plant (closed 2006), Seaview in Lower Hutt, Riccarton (opened 1948, closed 2006) and Wainuiomata (closed 1997) and in Australia at Tottenham, Hallam, Braybrook and Brooklyn in Melbourne. In 1997 when the Wainuiomata and Kakariki yarn plants closed, the chief executive of Feltex Carpets stated that carpets made up 92 percent of Feltex's business while yarns was just 8 percent. The yarns business was struggling due to the high dollar, decline in hand knitting and less use of wool in fashion fabrics.

Community activity
From 1970 to 1985, Feltex sponsored the New Zealand Feltex Awards, which recognised technical and artistic achievement in television.

References

External links
Official Website
1950 overview of company and its subsidiaries

Textile companies of New Zealand
Textile companies of Australia
Carpet manufacturing companies
1921 establishments in Australia
1921 establishments in New Zealand
Manufacturing companies based in Melbourne